Sydney Island is situated in the Gulf of Carpentaria and is one if the islands of the Wellesley Islands group.

See also

 List of islands of Australia

References

Sydney Island at the Gazetteer of Australia

Islands of Queensland
North West Queensland
Gulf of Carpentaria